The 1954–55 Georgetown Hoyas men's basketball team represented Georgetown University during the 1954–55 NCAA college basketball season. Harry "Buddy" Jeannette coached them in his third season as head coach. The team was an independent and played its home games at McDonough Gymnasium on the Georgetown campus in Washington, D.C. It finished with a record of 12-13 and had no post-season play.

Season recap

Sophomore forward Matt White joined the varsity team this year after a year on the freshman team. He scored in double figures eight times, including a season-high 22 in an upset of Fordham in the opening game of the Queen City Tournament in Buffalo, New York. He averaged 11.2 points per game, but his year came to an abrupt end when, with seven games remaining, he was among four players suspended for the rest of the season for violating team rules during a road trip.

Junior forward Warren Buehler had his second consecutive strong offensive season, scoring in double figures in 21 of the season's 25 games. For the second year in a row, the team lost one of its top scorers to an academic suspension at midseason, but Buehler compensated with ever-greater offensive performances, scoring in double figures in 15 of the final 16 games, including a season-high 31 points against Seton Hall. He ended the season as the team's top scorer for the second straight year.

Like White, sophomore center Joe Missett came to the varsity from the freshman team. He played in 20 of the season's 25 games and proved a capable center who could open up scoring opportunities for forwards Buehler and White. He scored a season-high 22 points against New York University and finished the season averaging 9.3 rebounds per game and as the team' second-highest scorer after Buehler.

The 1954–55 team opened the season at 9-3, but the various player suspensions affected its performance later in the year, and it lost 10 of its last 13 games and eight of its last ten. It finished the season with a record of 12-13, had no postseason play, and was not ranked in the Top 20 in the Associated Press Poll or Coaches' Poll at any time.

Roster
Sources

1954–55 schedule and results

Sources

|-
!colspan=9 style="background:#002147; color:#8D817B;"| Regular Season

Notes

References

Georgetown Hoyas men's basketball seasons
Georgetown
Georgetown Hoyas men's basketball team
Georgetown Hoyas men's basketball team